Anatoly Moiseevich Vershik (born on 28 December 1933 in Leningrad) is a Soviet and Russian mathematician.  He is most famous for his joint work with Sergei V. Kerov on representations of infinite symmetric groups and applications to the longest increasing subsequences.

Biography 
Vershik studied at Leningrad State University, receiving his doctoral degree in 1974; his advisor was Vladimir Rokhlin.

He works at the Steklov Institute of Mathematics and at Saint Petersburg State University.  In 1998–2008 he was the president of the St. Petersburg Mathematical Society.

In 2012 Vershik became a fellow of the American Mathematical Society. 
In 2015, he has been elected a member of Academia Europaea.

His doctoral students include Alexander Barvinok, Dmitri Burago, Anna Erschler, and Sergey Fomin.

See also 
Bratteli–Vershik diagram

References

Bibliography 
 Vladimir Arnold, Mikhail Sh. Birman, Israel Gelfand, et al., "Anatolii Moiseevich Vershik (on the occasion of his sixtieth birthday", Russian Math. Surveys 49:3 (1994), 207–221. 
 Anatoly Vershik, Admission to the mathematics faculty in Russia in the 1970s and 1980s, Mathematical Intelligencer vol. 16, No. 4, (1994), 4–5.

External links 
 Vershik's personal home page at St. Petersburg Department of the Steklov Mathematical Institute
 Vershik's CV

1933 births
Living people
Soviet mathematicians
20th-century Russian mathematicians
21st-century Russian mathematicians
Mathematicians from Saint Petersburg
Academic staff of Saint Petersburg State University
Combinatorialists
Fellows of the American Mathematical Society